Just a Matter of Time is an album by American vocalist Marlena Shaw recorded in 1976 and released on the Blue Note label.

Reception
The Allmusic review by Andrew Hamilton awarded the album 2½ stars stating "This is her most commercial Blue Note offering".

Track listing
 "It's Better Than Walkin' Out" (Lee Garrett, Robert Taylor) - 4:20  
 "Brass Band" (Bradford Craig) - 3:40  
 "This Time I'll Be Sweeter" (Gwen Guthrie, Patrick Grant) - 4:57  
 "Think About Me" (Gwen Guthrie, Patrick Grant) - 4:30  
 "You and Me" (Carson Whitsett) - 3:57  
 "Love Has Gone Away" (Charles Simmons, Joseph Jefferson) - 4:53  
 "Sing to Me" (Benard Ighner) - 4:00  
 "Take My Body" (Bettye Crutcher) - 4:53  
 "Be for Real" (Frederick Knight) - 4:59  
 "No Hiding Place" (Arranged and adapted by Marlena Shaw) - 2:13
Recorded at Mediasound Studios in New York City in February 1976.

Personnel
Marlena Shaw - vocals
George Butcher, Ricky Williams - keyboards
Bert De Coteaux - keyboards, arranger
Jerry Friedman, Hugh McCracken, Jeff Mironov, Lance Quinn - guitar
Bob Babbitt - electric bass
Jimmy Young - drums
Carlos Martin - conga
David Carey, Teddy Sommer - percussion

References

Blue Note Records albums
Marlena Shaw albums
1976 albums